Felix de Rooy  (born 3 November 1952) is an  Afro-Curaçaoan poet, writer, dramatist, filmmaker, director, artist and curator. In 1979, de Rooy was award the Cola Debrot Prize, the highest cultural award in the former Netherlands Antilles. In 1990, he won the Golden Calf for Ava & Gabriel.

Education 
After studying at the Vrije Akademie in The Hague, de Rooy received a Master of Arts in filming and directing at New York University in 1982.

Filmography 

 Desiree (1984)
 Almacita, Soul of Desolato (1986)
 Ava and Gabriel: A Love Story (1990)
 Marival (1997)
 Muhe Frida (2011)

References

External links

1952 births
Living people
Art directors
Curaçao poets
Curaçao film directors
Curaçao artists